The 2017 UEC European Track Championships was the eight edition of the elite UEC European Track Championships in track cycling and took place at the Velodrom in Berlin, Germany, between 19 and 22 October 2017. The event was organised by the European Cycling Union. All European champions were awarded the UEC European Champion jersey which could have been worn by the champion throughout the year when competing in the same event at other competitions.

The 12 Olympic events (sprint, team sprint, team pursuit, keirin, madison and omnium for men and women), as well as 11 other events were on the program for these European Championships.

Schedule
Schedule only indicating the finals.

Events

Notes 
 Competitors named in italics only participated in rounds prior to the final.
 These events are not contested in the Olympics.
 In the Olympics, these events are contested within the omnium only.

Medal table

See also
 2017 UEC European Track Championships (under-23 & junior)

External links 
Results book

References

 
2017 in track cycling
European Track Championships
2017 UEC
International cycle races hosted by Germany
Sports competitions in Berlin
October 2017 sports events in Europe